The Trentino-Alto Adige/Südtirol provincial elections of 2008 took place on 26 October 2008 in South Tyrol and on 9 November in the Trentino. It was the first time since 1946 that elections were not held on the same day.

The Trentino election was postponed as the Union of Christian and Centre Democrats' list (which would have supported Lorenzo Dellai) was excluded from the race due to lack of signatures.

Trentino

In Trentino, where the President is elected directly by the people, incumbent Lorenzo Dellai (Union for Trentino, supported also by the Democratic Party, the Trentino Tyrolean Autonomist Party, the Union of Christian and Centre Democrats, the Greens and Democrats of Trentino, Loyal to Trentino, Italy of Values, and the Ladin Autonomist Union) defeated Sergio Divina (Northern League, supported also by The People of Freedom, Divina Civic List, Popular Autonomists, United Valleys, Fassa Association, Pensioners' Party, The Right, Tricolour Flame and other minor parties) by a landslide.

The Democratic Party (PD) became the largest party in the Province, followed by Union for Trentino (UpT) and Lega Nord Trentino (LNT). The People of Freedom (PdL) lost many votes to LNT, UPT and the Trentino Tyrolean Autonomist Party (PATT). In fact both UpT and PATT were centrist parties, running strong campaigns at the provincial level.

South Tyrol

In South Tyrol the South Tyrolean People's Party (SVP), which had governed the Province for sixty years, was confirmed by far as the largest party, but lost many votes to Die Freiheitlichen. Also South Tyrolean Freedom (a splinter group from Union for South Tyrol) and Northern League (LN) made gains, while The People of Freedom (PdL), the Democratic Party (PD) and the Greens all lost votes and seats.

After the election President Luis Durnwalder proposed a coalition composed of SVP, PD and LNST, but finally stuck to the SVP–PD alliance.

References

External links
Province of Trento – 2008 provincial election
Province of Bolzano – 2008 provincial election

Elections in Trentino-Alto Adige/Südtirol
2008 elections in Italy